Gwangsan No clan was one of the Korean clans. Their Bon-gwan was in Gwangju. According to the research in 2015, the number of Gwangsan No clan was 102329. He fled from China with his children to avoid An Lushan Rebellion happened in 755.

See also 
 Korean clan names of foreign origin

References

External links 
 

 
Korean clan names of Chinese origin